The 1959–60 Copa del Generalísimo was the 58th staging of the Spanish Cup. The competition began on 22 November 1959 and ended on 26 June 1960 with the final.

First round

|}
 Tiebreaker

|}

Round of 32

|}
 Tiebreaker

|}

Round of 16

|}
 Tiebreaker

|}

Quarter-finals

|}

Semi-finals

|}

Final

|}

External links
 rsssf.com
 linguasport.com

Copa del Rey seasons
Copa del Rey
Copa